Central Consolidated Schools (also known as the Central Consolidated School District) is a public school district based in Shiprock, New Mexico, United States.

The district covers a  area in western San Juan County.

Service area
In addition to Shiprock, the district also serves the communities of Beclabito, Fruitland, Kirtland, Naschitti,  Nenahnezad, Newcomb, Ojo Amarillo,  Sanostee, Sheep Springs, Upper Fruitland, and Waterflow, as well as almost all of Crystal.

Schools

Kirtland Area
Kirtland Central High School (Grades 9-12)
Kirtland Middle School (Grades 7-8)
Grace B. Wilson Elementary (Grades 4-6)
Kirtland Elementary School (Grades K-6)
Ojo Amarillo Elementary School (Grades K-6)
Ruth N. Bond Elementary School (Grades K-3)
Kirtland Early Childhood Center (Grades PK-K)

Newcomb Area
Newcomb High School (Grades 9-12)
Newcomb Middle School (Grades 6-8)
Newcomb Elementary School (Grades (K-5)
Naschitti Elementary School (Grades K-6)

Shiprock Area

Shiprock High School (Grades 9-12)
Career Prep Alternative High School (Grades 9-12)
Tse' Bit'Ai Middle School (Grades 7-8)
Mesa Elementary School (Grades 4-6)
Eva B. Stokely Elementary School (Grades 4-6)
Nizhoni Elementary School (Grades K-3)
Nataani Nez Elementary School (Grades K-3)

Enrollment
2007-2008 School Year: 6,891 students
2006-2007 School Year: 6,737 students
2005-2006 School Year: 6,950 students
2004-2005 School Year: 7,007 students
2003-2004 School Year: 6,948 students
2002-2003 School Year: 7,083 students
2001-2002 School Year: 7,307 students
2000-2001 School Year: 7,325 students

Demographics
There were a total of 6,891 students enrolled in Central Consolidated Schools during the 2007-2008 school year. The gender makeup of the district was 48.59% female and 51.41% male. The racial makeup of the district was 89.22% Native American, 8.29% White, 2.12% Hispanic, 0.26% African American, and 0.12% Asian/Pacific Islander.

See also
List of school districts in New Mexico

References

External links
Central Consolidated Schools – Official site.

School districts in New Mexico
Education in San Juan County, New Mexico
Education on the Navajo Nation